Geophilus alzonis is a species of soil centipede in the family Geophilidae found in Monte Alzo near Tolosa in Spain, which it was named after. It's a poorly defined species that was described as being light yellow with a light chestnut brown head and 13-14 mm long, with small but numerous leg bristles, sternites bearing three longitudinal furrows, a carpophagus formation from segments 3-6 to segments 11th-13, and 37-51 leg pairs.

References

alzonis
Animals described in 1951
Myriapods of Europe